Gaby and the Thurstones are an American indie folk band from Rochester, New York, United States. In 2012, the triple singer-songwriter conglomerate released a self-titled eight-song album, which received critical praise for its "laid-back [and] pleasant folk tunes--all of which are reminiscent of nu-folk artists such as Fleet Foxes, Iron & Wine, and The Tallest Man On Earth". The album received particular critical praise for its self-released single "Patchwork". Their second EP, Ghost, was released on January 26, 2013.

Discography

Albums

Singles

References

Indie pop groups from New York (state)